Zhuzhou West railway station is a station on the Wuhan–Guangzhou High-Speed Railway, serving the city of Zhuzhou, in Hunan Province of China. The station is located on the western outskirts of the city, about 10 km west of downtown Zhuzhou and the "conventional" Zhuzhou railway station.

The station building consists of a waiting hall located on the eastern side of the high-speed lines, connected to the platforms via an overhead bridge and exit tunnel beneath the lines. The McDonald's is located inside the waiting hall, and a KFC is located beside the exit.

Railway stations in Hunan
Railway stations in China opened in 2009
Stations on the Wuhan–Guangzhou High-Speed Railway